Money exchange can refer to:

 Bureau de change, a business where people can exchange one currency for another
 Foreign exchange market